= Chamelequin =

Board game

Chamelequin is a board game published in 1989 by R&D Games.

== Contents ==
Chamelequin is a game in which the colours on the board on which the pieces move continue to change.

== Reception ==
David Pritchard reviewed Chamelequin for Games International magazine, and gave it a rating of 7 out of 10, and stated that "It is a sad reflection on the UK market that games often sell on the visual impact of the box lid. But that has to be good news for the makers of Chamelequin who have not only a striking box design but, unusually for an abstract game, have hit on a name that conveys something of the theme."
